NGC 7354 is a planetary nebula located in the northern circumpolar constellation of Cepheus, at a distance of approximately  from the Sun. It was discovered by German-born astronomer William Herschel on November 3, 1787. John L. E. Dreyer described it as, "a planetary nebula, bright, small, round, pretty gradually a very little brighter middle".

This nebula is the result of an aging star casting off its outer atmosphere. Overall the nebula is elliptical in form, with a complex interior structure having inner and outer shells, several bright equatorial knots, and two jet-like features near the nebula poles. The rim of the inner shell is ellipsoidal with an aspect ratio of 1.6 and a major axis spanning . The faint outer shell is expanding with a higher velocity than the inner shell, and the knots are moving at the same velocity as the outer shell. The outer shell has an estimated age of 2,500 years, while the inner shell is 1,600 years old.

The morphological features of the nebula may be explained by an interacting binary star system with one of the pair passing through the asymptotic giant branch phase. The jets may be generated by an accretion disk surrounding the resulting white dwarf star. Additionally, an analysis of Gaia data suggests that the central star is binary.

References

External links 
 

Planetary nebulae
7354
Cepheus (constellation)